Mahmoud Hassan Mgimwa (born 13 March 1963) is a Tanzanian CCM politician and Member of Parliament for Mufindi North constituency since 2010.

References

1963 births
Living people
Tanzanian Muslims
Chama Cha Mapinduzi MPs
Deputy government ministers of Tanzania
Tanzanian MPs 2010–2015
Shinyanga Commercial School alumni
Mzumbe University alumni